Kerala is an Indian state, where federal legislative power is vested in the unicameral Kerala Legislative Assembly. The multilateral system has, since 1956, been dominated by the several pre-poll and post-poll alliances.

The judiciary of Kerala is independent of the executive and the legislature, while it is common for leading members of the executive (Kerala Council of Ministers) to be members of the legislature as well. The political system is laid out in the Constitution of India (1950).

Legislative Assembly has a membership of 141, where 140 are elected and one is nominated from the Anglo-Indian community. Kerala has 20 seats in the Lok Sabha (Indian Lower House) and nine seats in the Rajya Sabha (the Council of States). Elections are also held to choose representatives to the civic bodies at various levels within Kerala.

Political parties

National parties

Recognised State Parties

Electoral history 

Results for the Kerala Legislative Assembly (from 1957) have been:

(Source)

Popular vote

Ideologies

Left-wing/center-left politics 
The general socio-political thought and behavior of the Keralite population inclines strongly toward left-wing and center-left groups, as such, communist (Communist Party of India, Communist Party of India (Marxist)) parties have made strong inroads across the state for decades. In fact, Kerala is the first autonomous polity in Asia and only second in the world to have democratically elected a fully communist-led (Communist Party of India) government into power, with the first-ever being San Marino, a microstate enclaved by Italy.

Northern Kerala, particularly the districts of Kannur and Palakkad, is generally considered the heartland of communist support. The districts of Kollam and Alappuzha also generally inclined towards left-wing or center-left parties, even though the United Democratic Front have won elections from the constituencies of these districts several times.

Some parties like Communist Marxist Party, Janathipathiya Samrakshana Samithy and the Revolutionary Marxist Party of India also represent left-wing politics in the state.

Congress politics 
Indian National Congress leads the United Democratic Front pre-poll alliance in Kerala. The alliance was created by the Congress (then known as Congress-Indira) party leader K. Karunakaran in 1978. Since the 1980s, it has sustained itself as the front to take on the Communist Party of India Marxist-led Left Democratic Front.

The alliance first came into power in Kerala in 1981 under K. Karunakaran. It led the Kerala government in 1981 - 82 (Karunakaran), 1982 - 87 (Karunakaran), 1991 - 96 (Karunakaran and A. K. Antony), 2001 - 06 (Antony and Oommen Chandy) and 2011 - 16 (Chandy).

The party has strong bases in Ernakulam and Kottayam regions of central Kerala.

The Nationalist Congress Party and Congress (S) are the another parties which holds the Congress politics. Both of them were split from Indian National Congress, and now form allies of LDF. The Kerala Congress factions also have their origin in a split which occurred in Indian National Congress in the year 1964. DIC(K) was another party formed by raising Congress politics in Kerala, but was later dissolved.

Communitarian politics 
Indian Union Muslim League is a major member of the United Democratic Front. Indian Union Muslim League first gained a ministry in Kerala Government as part of a Communist Party of India Marxist-led alliance in the late 1960s. The party later switched fronts and formed an alliance with the Congress. It later became a chief constituent in a succession of Indian National Congress-lead ministries.

The party has strong bases in Malappuram District in central Kerala. The party is also strong in the northern belts of Kasaragod district and the southern parts of Kozhikode district in Northern Kerala.

Kerala Congress, which has several factions in United Democratic Front and Left Democratic Front, has strong influence in central Kerala. The various Kerala Congress factions are primarily patronized by Syrian Christian community mostly in Central Travancore areas like Kottayam, Idukki, Pathanamthitta and Muvattupuzha.

Right-wing politics 
Right-wing politics in Kerala is represented by the Bharatiya Janata Party. The BJP got their first seat in the Kerala legislative assembly in 2016. The BJP failed to win a seat in the 2021 elections.

Coalition politics 

The current politics in Kerala is largely dominated by two pre-poll alliances

 Communist Party of India (Marxist)-led Left Democratic Front (LDF) and
 Indian National Congress-led United Democratic Front (UDF)

The two alliances have been alternatively voted to power in Kerala since 1980 (from the First E. K. Nayanar ministry).

The pre-poll political alliances of Kerala have stabilized strongly in such a manner that, with rare exceptions, most of the coalition partners stick their loyalty to the respective alliances (Left Democratic Front or United Democratic Front). As a result of this, ever since 1979, the power has been clearly alternating between the two alliances without any exceptions, until this spell was broken in the 2021 Kerala Legislative Assembly election.

However, till then the political scenario in Kerala (1957 - 1980) was characterized by continually shifting alliances, party mergers and splits, factionalism within the coalitions and within political parties, and the formation of a numerous splinter groups.
In the late 1970s and early 1980s, two main pre-poll political alliances were formed: the Left Democratic Front, led by the Communist Party of India (Marxist) and Communist Party of India and the United Democratic Front, led by the Indian National Congress.

Since the early 1980s these two pre-poll political alliances have alternated in government with neither able to gain re-election for a second term. Clashes between supporters of the two coalitions have occurred periodically. Both have accused the other of corruption, promoting or condoning political violence, and "the general breakdown of law and order" during their periods in government.

Student politics 
 Communist Party of India Marxist - Student Federation of India (SFI)
 Indian National Congress - Kerala Student Union (KSU)
 Communist Party of India - All India Students' Federation (AISF)
 Indian Union Muslim League - Muslim Students Federation - MSF (MSF)
 Akhil Bharatiya Vidyarthi Parishad (ABVP)

2021 Assembly elections

See also
Political parties in Kerala

References

Further reading

External links 

Politics of Kerala